Jean van der Westhuyzen  (born 9 December 1998) is a South African-born Australian sprint canoeist.  He was educated at Michaelhouse, Balgowan, KwaZulu Natal.

He won a gold medal in the K2 1000 metres event at the 2020 Summer Olympics, competing alongside Thomas Green. Jean also competed in the K1 1000 metres in Tokyo, finishing in 11th place by coming 3rd in the B-final. Van Der Westhuyzen attend Elite, all-boys boarding school, Michaelhouse in the KwaZulu-Natal Midlands. 

Van der Westhuyzen began as a marathon and sprint paddler. It was only on his immigration to Australia from South Africa that he concentrated on sprint racing.

In the 2022 Australia Day Honours he was awarded the Medal of the Order of Australia.

References

External links
 
 Australian Olympic Committee Athlete Profile

1998 births
Living people
Australian male canoeists
Olympic canoeists of Australia
Canoeists at the 2020 Summer Olympics
South African emigrants to Australia
Medalists at the 2020 Summer Olympics
Olympic gold medalists for Australia
Olympic medalists in canoeing
Recipients of the Medal of the Order of Australia
Alumni of Michaelhouse
ICF Canoe Sprint World Championships medalists in kayak